David Puclin (born 17 June 1992) is a Croatian professional footballer who plays as a defensive midfielder for Varaždin, on loan from Ukrainian Premier League club Vorskla Poltava.

Club career
On 7 March 2022, FIFA announced that, due to the Russian invasion of Ukraine, all the contracts of foreign players in Ukraine are suspended until 30 June 2022 and they are allowed to sign with clubs outside Ukraine until that date. On 4 April 2022, Puclin signed with ADO Den Haag in the Netherlands under that rule until the end of the season.

References

External links
 

1992 births
Living people
Sportspeople from Čakovec
Association football midfielders
Croatian footballers
NK Međimurje players
HNK Gorica players
HNK Šibenik players
1. FC Saarbrücken players
NK Istra 1961 players
NK Slaven Belupo players
FC Vorskla Poltava players
ADO Den Haag players
NK Varaždin (2012) players
First Football League (Croatia) players
Regionalliga players
Croatian Football League players
Ukrainian Premier League players
Eerste Divisie players
Croatian expatriate sportspeople in Germany
Croatian expatriate sportspeople in Ukraine
Croatian expatriate sportspeople in the Netherlands
Expatriate footballers in Germany
Expatriate footballers in Ukraine
Expatriate footballers in the Netherlands